Niculae Spiroiu (6 July 1936 – 31 March 2022) was a Romanian engineer and retired Romanian Armed Forces general. Spiroiu served as the Minister of National Defense from 30 April 1991 to 6 March 1994. Spiroiu died on 31 March 2022, at the age of 85.

References

1936 births
2022 deaths
Romanian Ministers of Defence
Romanian Land Forces generals
Romanian engineers
Romanian military engineers
20th-century Romanian engineers
Military personnel from Bucharest